James Kenneth Jepson (8 April 1942 – 29 November 1989) was a Progressive Conservative party member of the House of Commons of Canada. He was born in Hamilton, Ontario and became a businessman by career.

He was elected at the London East electoral district in the 1984 federal election, thus he served in the 33rd Canadian Parliament. Jepson was defeated in London East in the 1988 federal election by Joe Fontana of the Liberal party. Barely a year after this very narrow loss, Jepson died aged 47 of heart failure.

References

External links
 

1942 births
1989 deaths
Businesspeople from Ontario
Members of the House of Commons of Canada from Ontario
Politicians from Hamilton, Ontario
Progressive Conservative Party of Canada MPs